Morris Island is an 840-acre (3.4 km²) uninhabited island in Charleston Harbor in South Carolina, accessible only by boat. The island lies in the outer reaches of the harbor and was thus a strategic location in the American Civil War. The island is part of the cities of Charleston and Folly Beach, in Charleston County.

History
Morris Island was heavily fortified to defend Charleston Harbor, with the fortifications centered on Fort Wagner. On January 9, 1861, the first shots of the American Civil War were fired from cannons by cadets of The Citadel at the Star of the West as the ship tried to resupply Fort Sumter.

It was the scene of heavy fighting during the Union Army's campaign to capture Charleston, and is perhaps best known today as the scene of the ill-fated assault by the 54th Massachusetts Volunteer Infantry, an African-American regiment. The regiment and this assault, where it suffered over 50% casualties, was immortalized in the film Glory.

After the Confederates abandoned Morris Island in 1863 the Union occupied it. In the next year they transferred 600 Confederate officers from Fort Delaware to Morris Island, 50 of whom were quickly exchanged. The others were utilized as human shields in an attempt to silence the Confederate artillery at Fort Sumter; in reaction to what the Confederacy did with POWs in Charleston to deter Union ships from firing on the city. None of these men were killed by artillery fire though several died of sickness. They soon became known in the South as the Immortal Six Hundred.

Beach erosion has destroyed any trace of the original fortifications on the island, including Fort Wagner.

Morris Island Light
Morris Island is also the site of the Morris Island Light, a lighthouse that stands on the southern side of the entrance to Charleston Harbor, north of the town of Folly Beach.

Ownership and preservation
Plans to commercially develop the 125 acres (506,000 m²) of high ground on the northern tip of Morris Island as a luxury residential area resulted in several groups fighting to have the island declared a national historical park or added to the Fort Sumter park.

Huffman was in negotiations to sell the island to a consortium of preservation groups, but claimed to have listed the island to see if there was any other interest. Huffman had waged a number of battles with the local development agencies to increase the zoning, which limited construction to five homes, but claimed to have grown tired of fighting and just wanted to sell.

On February 2, 2006, the Trust for Public Land (TPL), a non-profit private land conservation organization, announced the purchase of Morris Island for $4.5 million. Ginn Resorts had previously purchased the island for a reported $6.5 million.  In May 2008, TPL and partners, including the South Carolina Conservation Bank, the South Carolina State Ports Authority, the Civil War Trust, (a division of the American Battlefield Trust) and many private donors, purchased the island on behalf of the City of Charleston from Ginn Resorts for $3 million. In 2003, when a builder announced his plans to build houses on the tract, for which he had an option to buy, the Trust, local preservationist Blake Hallman and others formed the Morris Island Coalition, generated media attention and support for preservation and defeated the effort. Ginn Resorts was interested in developing the property, too, but ultimately decided to purchase it and then immediately sell it to the preservationists. According to TPL, the city and county are working "to complete a management plan to protect the island's nationally significant historical and natural resources."

References
Citations

Bibliography
 Zeller, Bob Fighting the Second Civil War: A History of Battlefield Preservation and the Emergence of the Civil War Trust Knox Press (2017).

External links
 Morris Lighthouse
 Morris Guide
Civil War Photos of Morris Island (CWPT)
 Assault on Battery Wagner: Maps, Histories, Photos, and Preservation News (CWPT)

Islands of Charleston County, South Carolina
Islands of South Carolina
Uninhabited islands of South Carolina
South Carolina Sea Islands